Pramadea crotonalis is a moth in the family Crambidae. It was described by Francis Walker in 1859. It is found in Sri Lanka.

References

Moths described in 1859
Moths of Sri Lanka
Spilomelinae
Taxa named by Francis Walker (entomologist)